Luis Bravo may refer to:

 Luis Bravo (musician), Argentinian musician, see List of number-one hits of 1966 (Argentina)
 Luis Bravo de Acuña (died 1634) Spaniard soldier
 Luis Felipe Bravo Mena (born 1952) Mexican politician
 Luis Armando Melgar Bravo (born 1966) Mexican politician
 Luis González-Bravo y López de Arjona (1811–1871) Spaniard politician

See also

 Bravo (surname)
 Nino Bravo (1944–1973, born Luis Manuel Ferri Llopis), Spaniard singer
 Bravo (disambiguation)
 Luis (disambiguation)